Mantila is a Finnish surname. Notable people with the surname include:

Auli Mantila (born 1964), Finnish film director, writer, producer, and actress
Jari Mantila (born 1971), Finnish Nordic combined skier

Finnish-language surnames
Surnames of Finnish origin